Mike Carter-Conneen is a communications strategist and former television journalist. He previously worked as an on-air reporter for WJLA-TV, the Washington, D.C. ABC affiliate, appearing on ABC 7 and its sister station NewsChannel 8.

Carter-Conneen was born in Naperville, Illinois.  He attended Highlands Ranch High School and graduated from the University of Colorado at Boulder with a bachelor's degree in broadcast news.  He also studied in Spain at the University of Seville.

Carter-Conneen started his career in Denver (KUSA-TV).  He has also worked in Flagstaff/Phoenix (KNAZ-TV/KPNX-TV) and Colorado Springs (KXRM-TV).

In 2015 he won a National Capital Chesapeake Bay Chapter Emmy Award for his work as a Multi Media Journalist.

References

Living people
American television journalists
University of Seville alumni
American LGBT journalists
American LGBT broadcasters
University of Colorado Boulder alumni
American male journalists
Year of birth missing (living people)